Serra Orrios is an important Nuragic archaeological complex located in the municipality of Dorgali, in the province of Nuoro.

Description
The site, dating from the 2nd millennium BC, is a sanctuary village, one of the best conserved of the Nuragic Sardinia, consisting of a hundred or so of circular huts, simple or even complex and clustered in isolation, and two sacred areas surrounded by sacred fences that separate them from the dwelling, inside which there are two temples of the megaron type.

It was excavated between 1936 and 1938 by Doro Levi. Subsequently, in 1961, the site was restored under the direction of Guglielmo Maetzke.

Bibliography
Albero Moravetti, Serra Orrios e i monumenti archeologici di Dorgali (PDF), sardegnacultura.it.
Archaeological sites in Sardinia